Grindstone Creek is a stream in the Unorganized North Part of Algoma District in Northeastern Ontario, Canada. It is in the Great Lakes Basin and is a left tributary of the Mississagi River.

Course
The stream begins at an unnamed lake in geographic Rioux Township. It flows southwest to another unnamed lake and continues southwest into Upper Grindstone Lake. The lake trends southwest into the northwest corner of geographic Wagg Township; the creek then flows southwest into Grindstone Lake. The lake trends southwest into geographic Dagle Township. Grindstone Creek leaves Grindstone Lake at the southwest, continues in a southwest direction, passes under Ontario Highway 129, and reaches its mouth at the Mississagi River. The Mississagi River flows to the North Channel on Lake Huron.

See also
List of rivers of Ontario

References

Rivers of Algoma District